The 1997 European Tour was the 26th official season of golf tournaments known as the PGA European Tour.

The season was made up of 34 tournaments counting for the Order of Merit, and several non-counting "Approved Special Events".

The Order of Merit was won by Scotland's Colin Montgomerie for the fifth year in succession.

Changes for 1997
There were several changes from the previous season, with the addition of the South African Open, which replaced the FNB Players Championship, and the loss of the Catalan Open, the Austrian Open and the Scottish Open, which was effectively superseded by the Loch Lomond World Invitational.

Schedule
The following table lists official events during the 1997 season.

Unofficial events
The following events were sanctioned by the European Tour, but did not carry official money, nor were wins official.

Order of Merit
The Order of Merit was titled as the Volvo Order of Merit and was based on prize money won during the season, calculated in Pound sterling.

Awards

See also
List of golfers with most European Tour wins

Notes

References

External links
1997 season results on the PGA European Tour website
1997 Order of Merit on the PGA European Tour website

European Tour seasons
European Tour